Samuel Ward (born 19 January 1995) is a Swedish professional ice hockey goaltender. He is currently playing with Västerviks IK in the Swedish HockeyAllsvenskan.

Ward made his professional and Swedish Hockey League debut playing with Luleå HF during the 2012–13 SHL season.

References

External links

1995 births
Living people
Asplöven HC players
Luleå HF players
Sparta Warriors players
Västerviks IK players
Swedish ice hockey goaltenders
Swedish expatriate ice hockey players in Norway
People from Nyköping Municipality
Sportspeople from Södermanland County